Alsenz-Obermoschel is a former Verbandsgemeinde ("collective municipality") in the Donnersbergkreis, in Rhineland-Palatinate, Germany. On 1 January 2020 it was merged into the new Verbandsgemeinde Nordpfälzer Land. It was situated on the river Alsenz, approx. 15 km south of Bad Kreuznach, and 30 km north of Kaiserslautern. The seat of the municipality was in Alsenz.

Local municipalities
The Verbandsgemeinde Alsenz-Obermoschel consisted of the following Ortsgemeinden ("local municipalities"):

Former Verbandsgemeinden in Rhineland-Palatinate
North Palatinate